Liangshan railway station is a railway station in Liangshan County, Jining, Shandong, China. It is an intermediate stop on the Beijing–Kowloon railway.

The station will be rebuilt and will become an intermediate stop on the currently under construction Beijing–Shangqiu high-speed railway.

References 

Railway stations in Shandong